Xai-Xai Chongoene Airport , whose official name is Filipe Jacinto Nyusi Airport, is a commercial airport in Xai-Xai, Mozambique.

History 
The airport was built with Chinese government funds. On 29 November 2021, the airport was inaugurated by Mozambique's President, Filipe Nyusi.

Airlines and destinations

References

External links 
 

2021 establishments in Mozambique
Airports established in 2021
Airports in Mozambique
Buildings and structures in Gaza Province